Rosa María Andrés Rodríguez (born 29 May 1977) is a former professional Spanish tennis player. Her highest singles and doubles rankings are 152 and No. 81, respectively.

Biography
In her career, Andrés won eight ITF Women's Circuit singles titles, 28 doubles titles and one WTA Tour doubles title.

In 2005, Andrés partnered Andreea Vanc to win her first and only WTA title, winning the doubles event in Strasbourg, France.

Andrés played at Grand Slam tournaments on multiple occasions, but failed to qualified in singles and could not make it past round one in doubles. She also did not manage to win an ITF title bigger than $25k events.

Rosa retired from professional tennis, after losing in round one of the women's doubles event of the 2005 US Open.

WTA career finals

Doubles: 2 (1 title, 1 runner-up)

ITF finals

Singles (8–10)

Doubles (28–10)

References

External links
 
 

Living people
1977 births
People from Son Servera
Spanish female tennis players
Tennis players from the Balearic Islands
20th-century Spanish women
21st-century Spanish women